Deerfield School may refer to:

 Deerfield Beach Elementary School in Deerfield Beach, Florida, listed on the National Register of Historic Places in Broward County, Florida
 Old Deerfield School in Deerfield Beach, Florida, listed on the National Register of Historic Places in Broward County, Florida
 Deerfield School (Deerfield, Virginia), listed on the National Register of Historic Places in Augusta County, Virginia
 Deerfield Academy a coeducational boarding school in Deerfield, Massachusetts